WIST may refer to:

 WIST-FM, a radio station (98.3 FM) licensed to Thomasville, North Carolina, United States
 WQNO, a radio station (690 AM) licensed to New Orleans, Louisiana, United States, which held the call sign WIST from 2005 to 2012
 WIST-94, a Polish pistol
 Whist, a classic card game
 WYFQ, a radio station (930 AM) licensed to Charlotte, North Carolina, United States, which held the call sign WIST from 1947 to the 1960s
 WHVN, a radio station (1240 AM) licensed to Charlotte, North Carolina, United States, which held the call sign WIST from the 1960s to 1983
 WNKS, a radio station (95.1 FM) licensed to Charlotte, North Carolina, United States, which held the call sign WIST-FM prior to 1972
 WGFY, a radio station (1480 AM) licensed to Charlotte, North Carolina, United States, which held the call sign WIST from 1994 to 1996
 WOLS, a radio station (106.1 FM) licensed to Waxhaw, North Carolina, United States, which held the call sign WIST-FM from 1995 to 1996
 WAME, a radio station (550 AM) licensed to Statesville, North Carolina, United States, which held the call sign WIST from 1996 to 1997 and from 1998 to 2000
 WBLO, a radio station (790 AM) licensed to Thomasville, North Carolina, United States, which held the call sign WIST during 2004

See also
 Wist, an application for smartphones that helped users find top five restaurants, bars and coffee shops nearby
 Cole Wist, American attorney and politician
 Johannes B. Wist, Norwegian American newspaper editor, journalist and author